Governor Morehead School (GMS), formerly North Carolina State School for the Blind and Deaf, is a K–12 public school for the blind in Raleigh, North Carolina. In the era of de jure educational segregation in the United States, it served blind people of all races and deaf black people.

Its namesake is John Motley Morehead, Governor of North Carolina.

History
In 1845 the school was established; it took ages 5–21. It served African-American students from the beginning, in separate facilities under educational segregation in the United States. In 1898 a dormitory for the school was built by Frank Pierce Milburn.

It was the first American school to educate black, blind, and deaf students.

In 1923 white students moved to its current site in Raleigh, while black students were on the original campus, in Garner. The school took both deaf and blind black students.

In 1964 it got its current name. In 1966 the U.S. federal authorities were withholding $89,927 aid in Title I funds as the school had not yet desegregated. In 1967, as part of racial desegregation, the school began swapping the racial groups across the campuses. Black deaf students were to be moved to the North Carolina School for the Deaf and the East North Carolina School for the Deaf, so Morehead became a blind-only school. In 1977 desegregation was completed.

In 2014 there were discussions over whether the City of Raleigh should buy land that included GMS property. In 2014 the City of Raleigh offered to buy the Dorothea Dix property and the Morehead field for $51.26 million. The North Carolina House of Representatives approved a bill allowing the sale.

Campus
The school has dormitory facilities.

The campus hosts grades 6–10 of the Wake County Public Schools institution Wake Young Women's Leadership Academy.

It is adjacent to Central Prison.

Student body
 about 66% board.

Notable people
Skeeter Brandon, blues musician
Martha Louise Morrow Foxx, educator of the blind in Mississippi
Fred Hedrick, jurist
Vernon Malone, politician, former school superintendent
Ronnie Milsap, country musician
Doc Watson, bluegrass, country, folk, blues, and gospel musician

See also
 Eastern North Carolina School for the Deaf
 North Carolina School for the Deaf

References

Further reading

External links
 Governor Morehead School
 Governor Morehead Foundation
 Governor Morehead School - NCpedia

Schools for the blind in the United States
Schools for the deaf in the United States
Schools in Raleigh, North Carolina
Public boarding schools in the United States
Public K-12 schools in the United States
Public elementary schools in North Carolina
Public middle schools in North Carolina
Public high schools in North Carolina
1845 establishments in North Carolina
Educational institutions established in 1845
Historically segregated African-American schools in North Carolina